The 3rd Army was a field army-level command within the ground forces of Austria-Hungary during World War I. It was primarily active on the Eastern Front against the Russian Empire and in the Balkans against Serbia and Montenegro. Later on, the 3rd Army took part in some fighting on the Italian Front before returning to the eastern theater by 1917 to repulse the Kerensky Offensive. Its remaining units were merged with the 7th Army in January 1918.

History

1914
The 3rd Army was formed in August 1914 as part of Austria-Hungary's mobilization following its declaration of war on Serbia and Russia, carrying out the prewar plans for the formation of six field armies. Just as all Austro-Hungarian field armies, it consisted of a headquarters and several corps, along with some unattached units. The 3rd Army initially consisted of the XI and XIV Corps, based in Lemberg (modern day Lviv, Ukraine), and Innsbruck, respectively. In addition there were several divisions that were attached directly to army headquarters. It was placed under the overall command of General der Kavallerie Rudolf Ritter von Brudermann. Early on in the war the formation took part in the Battle of Galicia in the northeastern part of the Dual Monarchy, where it was part of the Austro-Hungarian force advancing from Lemberg towards the Russian Southwestern Front's positions. On 25 August 1914, they received word of advancing Russian forces near Zlota Lipa river and 3rd Army was ordered to engage them. The clash began on August 26, with what the Austrians believed were small Russian units, but turned out to be eight corps. It was not long before they were forced to retreat, reaching Lemberg on August 27. Although 3rd Army had the time to form a defensive line near the Gnila Lipa river, the advancing Russians outnumbered Bruderman's army three to one and drove them back on August 30, before seizing Lemberg itself in early September. Thus the Austro-Hungarian line had to retreat back to the Carpathians, losing the country's territory east of the mountain range to the Russians.

In September 1914, in the aftermath of the defense of Galicia, Bruderman had been replaced as the army commander by Svetozar Boroević von Bojna. Under his command the 3rd Army spent the remaining winter months of that year defending important mountain passes throughout the Carpathians.

1915

The 3rd Army, with support of the German South Army, spearheaded the offensive against Russian positions in the Carpathian Mountains in January 1915 in an attempt to reverse the losses during last year's Galicia debacle. By then it had been built up to include fifteen infantry and four and a half cavalry divisions for the assault, which began on January 23 with the goal of securing the rail and communications hubs of Medzilaborce, Sambir, and Sanok. Despite some early successes against numerically inferior enemy units which allowed them to advance about 38 kilometers, the Habsburg troops suffered from a lack of reinforcements and logistical problems. The mountain winter weather also turned for the worse as the overstretched 3rd Army had to defend its line from Russian counteroffensives, as it occupied a large gap between two important passes on January 26. By early February, the Austro-Hungarian offensive had stalled without reaching the besieged Przemyśl fortress, and the Russians remained in control of the strategically important passes while 3rd Army divisions had been reduced to the size of brigades and lower. Thus it ended up losing its numerical advantage. By mid-February the Russian army had regained the initiative while the Austro-Hungarian troop strength had been badly depleted. The remaining men of 3rd Army were subjected to below freezing temperatures and other environmental dangers, lack of supplies, and no possibility of relief. By late February, it lost around 88,000 men—about 75% of its initial strength—and had to finally be reinforced by the newly-formed 2nd Army.

After the fighting in the Carpathians, the 3rd Army was assigned to take part in the Gorlice–Tarnów Offensive in southern Poland and Galicia. It was entrusted with seizing Przemyśl fortress as in the failed offensive earlier in 1915. The 3rd and 4th armies ended up retaking the Carpathian passes and took the fortifications outside of Przemyśl in the early days of June, with the fortress itself finally being retaken on 3 June 1915. The 3rd Army was briefly disbanded as its component units were broken up to reinforce other formations. Afterwards, from June until September, the formation was temporarily deactivated.

The 3rd Army was reactivated in early October 1915 for the second invasion of Serbia, as part of Army Group Mackensen, this time under the command of Hermann Kövess von Kövessháza. This army group crossed the Sava–Danube line into Serbia on October 5. The Habsburg troops, along with the Bulgarian forces of the 1st Army, were tasked with driving the main Serbian force into the awaiting German 11th Army. However, Field Marshal Radomir Putnik met the attacking forces while executing a series of retreats that kept most of his strength intact. August von Mackensen's 11th Army entered Belgrade on October 9, while Kövess's 3rd Army pursued the retreating Serbs. The campaign resulted in about 18,000 Habsburg casualties. The Serbs entered Montenegro in an attempt to reach Allied ships on the coast, and Austro-Hungarian supreme commander Franz Conrad von Hötzendorf gave the 3rd Army orders to not stop and to invade the small country as well. Their forces occupied Cetinje, the capital, on 13 January 1916.

1916–18
In mid-1916, the 3rd Army was redeployed to the Italian Front, where it was part of Army Group Archduke Eugen (commanded by Archduke Eugen of Austria), once again led by von Kövess. In the spring of that year, Hötzendorf decided to attempt an offensive in a part of the front away from the Isonzo river area where the main fighting had been occurring. It saw action against the Italians in the Battle of Asiago alongside the 11th Army, which began on 15 May 1916. The assault was initially very successful, pushing 8 kilometers on a front 70 kilometers in length, and then another 10 kilometers before reaching Asiago. However, the Brusilov Offensive in the east forced the Habsburg army command to withdraw some units there, and thus Archduke Eugen's force retreated just 5 kilometers ahead of where they had begun. In total the 3rd and 11th armies had taken some 150,000 casualties.

During the Kerensky Offensive of 1917, the 3rd Army fought under Generaloberst Karl Tersztyánszky von Nádas against the 8th Army of General Lavr Kornilov. Clashing with the 8th Army at Stanislau (modern day Ivano-Frankivsk, Ukraine), the 3rd Army drove back Kornilov's forces. The formation's remaining units were merged with the 7th Army in January 1918.

Order of battle in August 1914
Upon mobilization at the outbreak of war the 3rd Army consisted of the following units.

Order of battle in 1914–15
The following units were assigned to 3rd Army during the time of the Carpathian and Gorlice-Tarnów operations.
Assigned in August 1914:
II Corps (until May 1915)
IX Corps (until January 1915)
Assigned in November and December 1914:
Corps "Szurmay" (until February 1915)
XVIII Corps (until February 1915)
Assigned in January 1915:
V Corps (until February 1915)
VII Corps (until May 1915)
X Corps (until June 1915)
XIX Corps (until February 1915)
Assigned in February 1915:
XVII Corps (until June 1915)

Order of battle after Gorlice–Tarnów
The following units were assigned to 3rd Army in the period between mid-1915 and the end of the war in 1918.
Assigned in October 1915:
VIII Corps (until March 1916)
XII Corps (until June 1916)
XIX Corps (until September 1918)
Assigned in May 1916:
I Corps (until July 1916)
XVII Corps (until August 1918)
Assigned in June and July 1916:
III Corps (until July 1916)
5th Infantry Division (until September 1916)
Corps "Hadfy" (until June 1917)
VIII Corps (until January 1917)
Assigned in October 1916:
XIII Corps (until January 1918)
Assigned in March and April 1917:
5th Infantry Division (until December 1918)
XXVI Corps (until September 1917)

Commanders
The following served as the commander of the 3rd Army during its existence.

Chiefs of staff
The following served as the chief of staff of the 3rd Army.

Sources

Notes

Books
 
 
 

Field armies of Austria-Hungary
1914 establishments in Austria-Hungary
1918 establishments in Austria-Hungary
Military units and formations established in 1914
Military units and formations disestablished in 1918